Edward Chester Plow,  (September 28, 1904 – April 25, 1988) was a Canadian soldier and the 22nd Lieutenant Governor of Nova Scotia.

Education
Born in St. Albans, Vermont, he was educated at Lower Canada College and then entered the Royal Military College of Canada in 1921, student # 1649.

Career
He was commissioned in the Royal Canadian Horse Artillery in 1925. He served in Canada and England before World War II began. During World War II, he commanded the artillery of the 1st Canadian Corps. In 1944, he was promoted to Brigadier, Royal Artillery. 

After the war, he was promoted to Major-General and became the commander of the Eastern Command in Halifax, Nova Scotia. In 1958, he was appointed Lieutenant-Governor of Nova Scotia by Prime Minister John Diefenbaker and served until 1963.

He died of lung cancer in Brockville, Ontario in 1988.

Awards and decorations

References

 
 
4237 Dr. Adrian Preston & Peter Dennis (Edited) "Swords and Covenants" Rowman And Littlefield, London. Croom Helm. 1976. 
H16511 Dr. Richard Arthur Preston "To Serve Canada: A History of the Royal Military College of Canada" 1997 Toronto, University of Toronto Press, 1969.
H16511 Dr. Richard Arthur Preston "Canada's RMC - A History of Royal Military College" Second Edition 1982
H16511 Dr. Richard Preston "R.M.C. and Kingston: The effect of imperial and military influences on a Canadian community" 1968 
H1877 R. Guy C. Smith (editor) "As You Were! Ex-Cadets Remember". In 2 Volumes. Volume I: 1876-1918. Volume II: 1919-1984. Royal Military College. [Kingston]. The R.M.C. Club of Canada. 1984

External links
Generals of World War II

1904 births
1988 deaths
Military personnel from Vermont
Royal Military College of Canada alumni
Canadian generals
Royal Regiment of Canadian Artillery officers
Canadian Commanders of the Order of the British Empire
Canadian Companions of the Distinguished Service Order
Lieutenant Governors of Nova Scotia
Deaths from lung cancer
Deaths from cancer in Ontario
Canadian Army personnel of World War II
American emigrants to Canada